Yehuda Alharizi, also Judah ben Solomon Harizi or al-Harizi (Yehudah ben Shelomo al-Harizi, Yahya bin Sulaiman bin Sha'ul abu Zakaria al-Harizi al-Yahudi min ahl Tulaitila), was a rabbi, translator, poet, and traveler active in Spain in the Middle Ages (mid-12th century in Toledo? – 1225 in Aleppo). He was supported by wealthy patrons, to whom he wrote poems and dedicated compositions.

Life
Yehuda al-Harizi was born in Toledo in the mid-12th century to a family originally from Jerez and was educated in Castile. A Hebrew biographer and a contemporary, Ibn al-Sha’ar al-Mawsili (1197–1256), provided the only known physical description of al-Harizi:

As was the practice for educated men of the period, he traveled extensively throughout the region, visiting Jewish communities and various centres of learning across the Mediterranean and the East. He was disappointed by the poor quality of Hebrew learning across the region.

He translated many Arabic works into Hebrew, including Maimonides' Guide to the Perplexed (Ar. "Dalalat al-Ha’irin", Heb. "Moreh Nevukhim") and al-Hariri's Maqamat.

In addition to the many translations, he also produced original works in Hebrew and in Arabic. He wrote a book of his travels, . He also composed an original maqama in Hebrew, with the title of Sefer Tahkemoni. His Maqama imitated the structure of al-Hamadani and al-Hariri, but his work also reflects his Jewish identity in a society that was in transition, shifting from al-Andalus to Christian Iberia. He is generally regarded as one of the great classical Jewish authors.

He died in Aleppo, Syria in 1225.

Work
Alharizi was a rationalist, conveying the works of Maimonides and his approach to rationalistic Judaism. He translated Maimonides' The Guide for the Perplexed and some of his Commentary on the Mishnah, as well as the Mahbarot Iti'el of the Arab poet al-Hariri, from the Arabic to Hebrew.

Alharizi's poetic translation of the Guide for the Perplexed is considered by many to be more readable than that of Samuel ibn Tibbon. However, it has not been very widely used in Jewish scholarship, perhaps because it is less precise. It had some influence in the Christian world due to its translation into Latin.

Alharizi's own works include the Tahkemoni, composed between 1218 and 1220, in the Arabic form known as maqama. This is written in Hebrew in unmetrical rhymes, in what is commonly termed rhymed prose. It is a series of humorous episodes, witty verses, and quaint applications of Scriptural texts. The episodes are bound together by the presence of the hero and of the narrator, who is also the author. Another collection of his poetry was devoted to preaching ethical self-discipline and fear of heaven.

Alharizi undertook long journeys in the lands of the Middle East. His works are suffused with his impressions from these journeys.

He not only brought to perfection the art of applying Hebrew to secular satire, but he was also a brilliant literary critic and his maqama on the Andalusian Hebrew poets is a fruitful source of information.

Editions and translations
 Iudae Harizii macamae, ed. by Paulus Lagarde (Göttingen: Hoyer, 1883).
 Al-Harizi,  (Tahkemoni), ed. Toporowski (Tel Aviv: Maḥbarot le-sifrut, 1952)
 Al-Harizi, The Tahkemoni of Judah al-Harizi, trans. by Victor Emanuel Reichert, 2 vols (Jerusalem: Cohen, 1965-1973)
 Judah Alharizi, The Book of Tahkemoni: Jewish Tales from Medieval Spain, trans. by David Simha Segal (B'nai B'rith Book Service, 1996)  (repr. Littman Library of Jewish Civilization (Liverpool: Liverpool University Press, 2003), https://www.jstor.org/stable/j.ctv4rfr1p)
 High-quality scans of an 1899 edition of the Tahkemoni in Hebrew from daat.co.il
 Another scanned edition of Tahkemoni in Hebrew, Istanbul 1578 from hebrewbooks.org
 Saul Isaak Kaempf, Nichtandalusische Poesie andalusischer Dichter aus dem elften, zwölften und dreizehnten Jahrhundert: Ein Beitrag zur Geschichte der Poesie des Mittelalters, vol. 1 (Prague: Bellmann, 1858) (here a considerable section of the Tahkemoni is translated into German).

Literature on Alharizi's influence in the Christian world

Notes

References 
 Much of this article was translated from יהודה אלחריזי (Yehuda Alharizi) in the Hebrew-language Wikipedia. Retrieved March 14, 2005. Both articles are licensed under the GNU Free Documentation License, which allows translation with acknowledgement.
 See, on the Tahkemoni, Saul Isaak Kaempf: Die ersten Makamen aus dem Tachkemoni des Charisi, Berlin 1845

External links 
 Al-Ḥarizi, Judah B. Solomon B. Hophni in the Jewish Encyclopedia of 1901-1906

Further reading
J.N. Mattock, "The Early History of the Maqama," "Journal of Arabic Literature", Vol. 25, 1989, pp 1-18

13th-century Castilian rabbis
Harizi
Harizi
Harizi
Harizi
Harizi
Spanish male poets
Maqama
Medieval Jewish travel writers
Jews from al-Andalus